Cross-country Crime is a Hardy Boys Digest novel by Franklin W. Dixon, a pseudonym. It is the 134th book in the long-established Hardy Boys series of detective/adventure books, a series written for teenage readers over many years by a number of ghostwriters, most notably Leslie McFarlane.

Plot summary 
The Hardy brothers go for a vacation in the town of Evergreen. There, they meet a man suffering from amnesia who is a prime suspect for a bank robbery.

The Hardy Boys books
1995 American novels
1995 children's books